In mathematics, a nilcurve is a pointed stable curve over a finite field with an indigenous bundle whose p-curvature is square nilpotent.

The nilcurves form a stack over the moduli stack of stable genus g curves with r marked points in characteristic p, of degree 
p3g–3+r.

References

Algebraic geometry